, better known as , is a fictional character in Konami's Castlevania series of video games. His first appearance in the series was in the 1989 game Castlevania III: Dracula's Curse, but he is best known for his role in the critically acclaimed Castlevania: Symphony of the Night, released in 1997. His design in Symphony of the Night was created by Ayami Kojima, marking her first contribution to the Castlevania franchise.

In the series, Alucard is the son of Dracula, the antagonist of the Castlevania series. Due to his human mother, Lisa, Alucard is a dhampir, a half-human, half-vampire. His mother's death and admonition not to hate humanity caused him to take up arms against his father. In Dracula's Curse and Castlevania Legends, he fights against his father alongside the vampire hunters of the Belmont clan, and he is featured as the protagonist of Symphony of the Night. Alucard additionally is present in Castlevania: Aria of Sorrow and the follow-up sequel Castlevania: Dawn of Sorrow, where he interacts with the protagonist of both games, Soma Cruz, as the Japanese government agent . The Lords of Shadow reboot series, starting with the character's introduction in Castlevania: Lords of Shadow – Mirror of Fate, introduces a reimagined Alucard with a new backstory, revealing him as Trevor Belmont, once a mortal who was transformed into a vampire after his death at the hands of his biological father, the remorseful Dracula.

Several video game publications have provided praise and criticism on Alucard's character. In Aria of Sorrow and Dawn of Sorrow, where Alucard was present as Genya Arikado, reviewers noted that although he fell into a stereotypical character mold, the greater concentration on supporting characters was a welcomed change from previous Castlevania games.

Conception and design
Alucard debuted in Castlevania III: Dracula's Curse for the Nintendo Entertainment System, where he was designed by T. Fujimoto and I. Urata. He was intended to be a mirror image of his father, as evidenced by his name, his father's name spelled backwards. Much of the original artwork for the game was lost during the Great Hanshin earthquake. Alucard's subsequent appearances would largely be designed by Ayami Kojima, who managed the character designs for Castlevania: Symphony of the Night and Castlevania: Aria of Sorrow.

Kojima's work in Symphony of the Night was her first breakthrough into the gaming industry, and her dark, gothic style borrows heavily from bishōnen-style art. In Aria of Sorrow, Kojima's designs followed the "different route" theme that producer Koji Igarashi was attempting to pursue with Aria of Sorrow by placing it in a futuristic setting. Following this theme, Alucard's appearance as Genya Arikado was made much more contemporary, featuring modern attire as versus the medieval appearance of previous Castlevania characters. Kojima was not present in the design team for Castlevania: Dawn of Sorrow, and Arikado, along with the rest of the cast, were drawn in an anime style. Igarashi, also the producer of Dawn of Sorrow, wished to utilize the anime style as a marketing technique due to his belief that the Nintendo DS targeted a younger audience than previous Castlevania games had. The anime style would also serve as a litmus test as to whether future Castlevania games would incorporate the style.

Alucard's general appearance is that of a vampiric man who often wears a long coat, a vampire cape, and tall boots, which can increase his height in Castlevania: Symphony of the Night. In his original appearance in Castlevania III: Dracula's Curse, Alucard appears very much alike to a younger version of his father with little to no differences between his appearance and Dracula's. However, in Castlevania: Symphony of the Night, he has long blonde hair, yellow eyes, and occasionally is depicted with sharp vampire fangs. Alucard is noticeably taller than most other characters such as the vampire hunters of the Belmont Clan who he encounters, and according to in-game measurements, his height his 5'11" (180.34 cm), though using the aforementioned secret boots, his height can be increased to 6'3" (190.5 cm).

Voice actors
Symphony of the Night was the second Castlevania game to use voice actors for the characters (the first being the Akumajō Dracula X Chi no Rondo for the PC Engine Super CD-ROM², which released only in Japan at the time). The Japanese voice actor for Alucard was Ryōtarō Okiayu, and the English voice actor was Robert Belgrade. Igarashi noted that due to fan complaints over the poor voice acting in a majority of the original cast in Symphony of the Night, a new script for the game better translating the original Japanese text, as well as a set of new voice actors were used. In the Lords of Shadow series, he is voiced by Richard Madden, while he is voiced by James Callis in the 2017 Netflix series Castlevania.

Appearances
In the 1989 Castlevania III: Dracula's Curse for the NES, Alucard is initially a boss encountered by the primary protagonist, Trevor Belmont. If the player defeats Alucard, he can be utilized as a playable character in the game. This was a significant departure from the first two Castlevania games for the NES, and the fourth installment on the Super NES, which only featured Simon Belmont as the primary playable character, and Alucard's abilities, a fireball attack and the ability to transform into a bat, were unique elements introduced into the series. This is the first instance of Alucard with light colored hair.

Alucard's following appearance in the series is in the 1997 Castlevania: Symphony of the Night for the PlayStation and Sega Saturn, where he is featured as the game's protagonist and primary playable character. He is described as a man of great strength and inhuman beauty. Due to the brainwashing of the current member of the Belmont clan, Richter Belmont, Alucard heads to his father's castle to find Richter and ensure that Dracula does not return into the world. He encounters Richter, who has been controlled by the dark priest Shaft into believing he is the lord of Dracula's castle, and Alucard manages to free him from the spell controlling him. In response, Shaft creates an inverted version of Dracula's castle for Alucard to travel through, and Alucard defeats Shaft, and ultimately, Dracula as well. Symphony of the Night also expands on Alucard's background, revealing how his human mother, Lisa, was hunted down and executed by humans who believed her to be a witch. Despite this, Lisa admonished Alucard to respect humans and not hate them as his father did. Alucard's placement as a protagonist was unusual for the series up to that point, as previous Castlevania games had featured often members of the Belmont clan as the protagonists. Symphony of the Night would later be re-released as part of the Xbox Live Arcade for the Xbox 360, on the PlayStation Network for the PlayStation 3, and part of Castlevania The Dracula X Chronicles, a compilation that contained Symphony of the Night alongside Akumajō Dracula X Chi no Rondo.

The 1997 Castlevania Legends for the Game Boy was Alucard's third appearance in the series. Similar to his initial appearance in Dracula's Curse, he is a boss challenging the skills of the game's protagonist, Sonia Belmont. After she defeats him, he accepts her strength and decides to submerge his powers by sleeping, believing that she will defeat Dracula in his stead. Koji Igarashi later removed Castlevania Legends from the official canon of the series, meaning that the plot of the game never occurred in the series' continuity.

In the 2003 Castlevania: Aria of Sorrow for the Game Boy Advance, Alucard is present in disguise as the enigmatic Japanese government agent Genya Arikado in order to prevent the powers of his father, who was finally killed by Julius Belmont, from ending up in the wrong hands. He meets the game's protagonist, Soma Cruz, and explains his "power of dominance," or his ability to absorb the souls of the monsters he defeats and use their abilities. He instructs him to seek out the castle's throne room, where Soma realizes that he is Dracula's reincarnation. Arikado subsequently advises Soma to destroy the flow of chaos in the castle to free himself from his fate, which Soma succeeds in doing.

Alucard reprises his role as Arikado in the sequel to Aria of Sorrow, the 2005 Castlevania: Dawn of Sorrow for the Nintendo DS, where he works to stop the machinations of a cult headed by Celia Fortner to create a new dark lord by killing Soma. Arikado initially requests that Soma does not become involved, but gives him a letter and talisman from Mina when he encounters him later in the game. After both of Celia's "dark lord's candidates," Dmitrii Blinov and Dario Bossi, are defeated, Arikado stops Celia's attempt to force Soma to awaken into the new dark lord, but inadvertently allows Dmitrii to revive himself. He confronts him, but is stopped when Dmitrii uses Celia as a sacrifice to seal his powers. Following Soma's battle with Menace, a giant demon that sprouts from Dmitrii, Arikado explains to Soma that he is not destined to become the dark lord, nor does he need to. In the game's Julius Mode, Arikado is playable as Alucard after he is found in the castle.

Alucard was one of the playable characters in Castlevania Judgment for the Nintendo Wii, a fighting game based on the series.

A reimagined Alucard appears in Castlevania: Lords of Shadow – Mirror of Fate, the second installment in the Lords of Shadow reboot series, which follows a different continuity from the original. It is revealed that this version of Alucard was originally Trevor Belmont, the son of Gabriel and Marie Belmont, conceived before Gabriel was turned into a vampire and became the dark lord Dracula. Alucard later appears in the sequel Castlevania: Lords of Shadow 2 as a supporting character. Since the game takes place centuries later, Alucard's personality and standing towards his father have drastically changed. He believes that Dracula can still be redeemed and makes it his goal to free the world from tyranny and vanquish the evil that had corrupted him and his father.

Alucard makes a cameo appearance as an Assist Trophy in Super Smash Bros. Ultimate. He will also debut as a playable fighter in Brawlhalla on October 19, 2022.

In other media
A version of Alucard makes a minor appearance in Captain N: The Game Master. Here, he is depicted as a rebellious teenager who enjoys skateboarding and music, much to his father's chagrin. He appears in the Season 3 episode "Return to Castlevania", initially posing as an ally to the heroes before revealing himself to be in league with the Count.

A version of Alucard voiced by James Callis appears as a major character in the 2017 Castlevania animated series, which is primarily based on the 1989 video game Castlevania III: Dracula's Curse.

Reception
Alucard has received praise and criticism from several video game publications, primarily concentrating on his role in Symphony of the Night. GameSpot featured him in their article "All Time Greatest Game Hero". In a review of Symphony of the Night, RPGFan celebrated the fact that Alucard was not a member of the Belmont clan, the protagonists of most Castlevania games, and that the fact he was Dracula's son added "an element of depth to the plot" due to the varied reactions he would receive from the inhabitants of Dracula's castle. RPGamer disagreed with this assessment, noting that the plot and Alucard's role "isn't very deep" and secondary to the concentration on gameplay. GameSpot called Alucard's sprite and running animation "easily some of the most impressive visuals in the entire Castlevania library." James Paul Gee noted that "even though Alucard is a vampire hunter, he has no distinctive skills associated with this profession". In 2012, GamesRadar ranked him as the 91st best hero in video games. Empire also included Alucard on their list of the 50 greatest video game characters, ranking him as 34th.

Alucard's appearance in Aria of Sorrow and Dawn of Sorrow as Genya Arikado was also noted by reviewers. RPGamer celebrated how the greater concentration on supporting characters, including Arikado, were a welcome change from previous Castlevania games. RPGFan derided Arikado's "cool and impassive personality" as stereotypical, but praised the game's character development as setting him apart from previous supporting characters in the series. The switch to an anime style for the character designs in Dawn of Sorrow was notably criticized, as many reviewers preferred the designs made by Ayami Kojima. GameSpy deplored the "shallow, lifeless anime images" and IGN called the images "down to the level of 'generic Saturday morning Anime' quality."

The animated version of Alucard's characterization in Netflix's Castlevania series earned mixed responses, as he and his allies were overshadowed by Dracula's underlings, who were seen as more fleshed out cast members than Alucard. GameSpot agreed that the trio's appearances in the first episodes were underwhelming and that their relationship gets uninteresting quickly, as the cast spends most of their time interacting in a library. On the other hand, Blasting News felt that the second season of Castlevania gave more screentime to develop the chemistry between Alucard and his friends, in contrast to his brief role in the first season. A review from Destructoid expressed similar sentiments, largely due to the way Alucard and Trevor push aside their differences to defeat Dracula while insulting each other across the story, leaving good comic relief in the process. IGN felt that the relationship between Alucard and his father was one of the best aspects of the second season due to the performance of their voice actors.

See also
List of fictional dhampirs

References

Castlevania characters
Fictional characters with immortality
Fictional characters with superhuman durability or invulnerability
Fictional counts and countesses
Fictional half-vampires
Fictional hunters in video games
Fictional knights in video games
Fictional patricides
Fictional secret agents and spies in video games
Fictional swordfighters in video games
Fictional vampire hunters
Konami protagonists
Male characters in video games
Shapeshifter characters in video games
Vampire characters in video games
Video game bosses
Video game characters introduced in 1989
Video game characters who can move at superhuman speeds
Video game characters with slowed ageing
Video game characters with superhuman strength
Nobility characters in video games
Fictional monster hunters
Vampire superheroes